The opening ceremony of the 2010 Commonwealth Games was held at the Jawaharlal Nehru Stadium, the main stadium of the event, in New Delhi, India. It began at 7:00 PM (IST) on 3 October 2010 ending at 10:00 PM (IST) displaying India's varied culture in a plethora of cultural showcases. Wizcraft was given the contract to produce the opening and closing ceremonies of the 2010 Commonwealth Games.

Guests of Honour

The following were the guests that attended the opening ceremony of the 2010 Commonwealth Games:
  The Prince of Wales (now Charles III), representing Elizabeth II
  The Duchess of Cornwall (now Camilla, Queen Consort)
  Prince Edward, Earl of Wessex - Vice-Patron of the Commonwealth Games Federation
  Pratibha Patil – President of India
  Devisingh Shekhawat – First Gentleman of India
  Manmohan Singh – Prime Minister of India
  Gursharan Kaur – Spouse of the Prime Minister of India
  Michael Fennell – President of the Commonwealth Games Federation
  Mohamed Nasheed – President of the Maldives
  Marcus Stephen – President of Nauru 
  Albert II – Prince of Monaco
  Sir Anand Satyanand –  Governor General of New Zealand
  A. P. J. Abdul Kalam – Former President of India
  Sonia Gandhi –  Chairperson of National Advisory Council
  Kamalesh Sharma – Secretary General of the Commonwealth of Nations
  Jacques Rogge – President of the International Olympic Committee
  Sheila Dikshit – Chief Minister of Delhi
  Arjan Singh – Marshal of Indian Air Force

The Royal Family 
The Prince of Wales (now Charles III, representing Elizabeth II as Head of the Commonwealth), Camilla, Duchess of Cornwall and Prince Edward, Earl of Wessex attended the ceremony.

International Guests 
A total of three heads of state from outside India attended the opening ceremony; two from Commonwealth nations and one from a non-Commonwealth nation. The three head of states are Mohamed Nasheed, President of the Maldives, Marcus Stephen, President of Nauru and a multiple Commonwealth gold medallist, and Albert II, Prince of Monaco, a former Olympian, whose country Monaco is not a member of the Commonwealth. Sir Anand Satyanand, the Governor General of New Zealand (the first of Indian descent), attended the ceremony as well.

Alongside the Commonwealth president, attendees included International Olympic Committee president, Jacques Rogge. He was quoted as saying, "I think India has set a good foundation stone for the Olympics bid and a successful Commonwealth Games can help India mount a serious bid for the Olympics."

Programme

The opening ceremony featured aspects of India's heritage and culture in seven segments. It featured an aerostat costing U$8 million, measuring 40×80x12 meters and manufactured in Oswestry, England. The original plan was to have drummers on the aerostat, but the plan was cancelled. The ceremony started with the Indian national anthem which was played live at the stadium. The roof of the stadium turned into orange colour and the ground was lit up with three colours of the Indian flag – orange in the center, white in the middle and green near the boundary.

Rhythm of India

The countdown for the opening of commonwealth games started as the drums were being played, and fireworks exploded from the roof of the stadium. The aerostat slowly raised from the ground to the center space of the roof while a traditional Rajasthani hymn was being played by the musicians. Various Drummers from Assam, Kerala, Manipur, Karnataka, Odisha, Punjab and Meghalaya played a symphony that aimed to be "uniquely Indian in character, yet global in appeal". Seven year old tabla player Keshav from Puducherry played the tabla instrument in front of the audience live and he was given a big applause from the audience.

Swagatham

Hariharan led this segment, which created an amalgamation of Hindustani classical, Carnatic and folk music. The song was composed by A. R. Rahman, who also composed the official theme song of the games, and was performed by various artists along with Hariharan. Children from various Delhi schools participated in a simultaneous performance forming hands of an Indian woman in a pose of Namaste – a popular Indian salutation. Later, they separated and rearranged themselves in another formation representing the Indian flag colors of saffron, white and green while another group of children entered the stadium and covered the flag formations with a large white cloth. In a widely appreciated act, the children then made a mehndi – a traditional Indian art – on this large white piece of cloth in under 30 seconds on the spot.Latest News Updates

Tree of Knowledge

Pt. Birju Maharaj (Kathak), Guru Rajkumar Singhajit Singh-Charu Sija Mathur (Manipuri), Dr. Saroja Vaidyanathan (Bharatnatyam), Dr. Sonal Mansingh (Odissi), Bharati Shivaji (Mohiniattam) and Raja Reddy-Radha Reddy (Kuchipudi) choreographed 480 dancers bringing alive India's "Guru-Shishya Parampara" or the master-protege tradition on stage through classical dance recitals which also depicted four different seasons of India. The aerostat (the largest ever helium balloon built for such an event) formed the leaves of the Bodhi tree, while large strips elevated from the ground, made of silk and bamboo fibre form the tree trunk. After the display of classical dance, the dancers displayed yoga moves.

The Great Indian Journey

This segment will give a glimpse of the lives of the masses in India, as seen through a train window. Art director Omung Kumar created a 600-ft train of bamboo sticks for this. It portrayed a common man's life and every thing in it, such as the bangle shops, politicians campaigning, Bollywood, the cycle shop etc.

Finale
Academy and Grammy award winner A.R. Rahman ended the programme with his rendition of "Jiyo Utho Bado Jeeto", the theme song of the Delhi games, and "Jai Ho".

Gallery

List of national flag bearers 
Australia entered first as the host of the last games, and India entered last as the host. Excluding these two nations, the flag bearers entered by alphabetical order of their nations; Anguilla was the first (after Australia) and Zambia was the last (before India). Each flag bearer was preceded by a woman in traditional Indian dress, each reflecting a different part of the country, carrying a placard with the country's name.

 Pakistan's flag bearer was scheduled to be weightlifter Shujha-ud-din Malik. However, chef de mission Muhammad Ali Shah announced that he would carry the flag and took it from the designated flag-bearer.

Spectators' response

In the opening ceremony the head of organizing committee faced embarrassment, when he was booed by the spectators at the start of his welcome speech to 60,000 spectators in the opening ceremony. The atmosphere otherwise for the teams and officials was fine, especially when they offered warm applause to the neighbouring Pakistan squad, with whom it has tense relationships. Sri Lanka also got a loud applause. The head finished his speech in five minutes and then handed over to Michael Fennell, the Chief of the Commonwealth Games Federation.

Baton Procession
Boxer Vijender Singh carried the Queen's Baton into the Jawaharlal Nehru Stadium, at the Opening Ceremony. The baton was then passed to boxer Mary Kom, 5-time world champion. It was then passed to Samresh Jung, who was named best competitor of the 2006 Commonwealth Games in Melbourne, Australia . It was then passed to Sushil Kumar, world champion wrestler, who finally handed the Queen's Baton to the Prince of Wales (now Charles III).

References

External links

 Opening ceremony images at the official site

Opening Ceremony
Commonwealth Games opening ceremonies
Ceremonies in India
Articles containing video clips